Badister bullatus is a species of ground beetle in the genus Badister.

The species was first described as Carabus bullatus by Franz von Paula Schrank in 1798.

Description 
The Badister bullatus is an orange and black ground beetle.

It is commonly located in woodland, banks, and gardens.

They are located most commonly in Northwestern Europe, but are also located in the rest of Europe and Siberia.

References

Licininae
Beetles described in 1798